The 2017–18 Wake Forest Demon Deacons men's basketball team represented Wake Forest University during the 2017–18 NCAA Division I men's basketball season. The Demon Deacons were led by fourth-year head coach Danny Manning and played their home games at the Lawrence Joel Veterans Memorial Coliseum in Winston-Salem, North Carolina as members of the Atlantic Coast Conference. They finished the season 11–20, 4–14 in ACC play to finish in 14th place. They lost in the first round of the ACC tournament to Syracuse.

Previous season
The Demon Deacons finished 2016–17 season 19–14, 9–9 in ACC play to finish in tenth place. They defeated Boston College in the first round of the ACC tournament to advance to the second round where they lost to Virginia Tech. They received an at-large bid to the NCAA tournament as a No. 11 seed in the South region. There they lost in the First Four to Kansas State.

Offseason

Departures

Incoming Transfers

2017 recruiting class

2018 recruiting class

Roster

Schedule and results

|-
!colspan=9 style=| Exhibition

|-
!colspan=9 style=| Non-conference regular season

|-
!colspan=12 style=| ACC regular season

|-
!colspan=9 style=| ACC tournament

References

Wake Forest Demon Deacons men's basketball seasons
Wake Forest